Järve is of Estonian origin (meaning lake), and may refer to:

Places
Järve, Tallinn, subdistrict of Tallinn
Järve, Kohtla-Järve, subdistrict of Kohtla-Järve
Järve, Toila Parish, village in Toila Parish, Ida-Viru County
Järve, Pärnu County, village in Lääneranna Parish, Pärnu County
Järve, Saare County, village in Saaremaa Parish, Saare County

People
 Sven Järve (born 1980), Estonian épée fencer

See also
Järv (disambiguation)
Järveküla (disambiguation)

Estonian-language surnames